The 1955 South Dakota Coyotes football team was an American football team that represented the University of South Dakota as a member of the North Central Conference (NCC) during the 1955 college football season. In their 17th season under head coach Harry Gamage, the Coyotes compiled a 4–4 record (3–3 against NCC opponents), tied for fifth place out of seven teams in the NCC, and outscored opponents by a total of 191 to 151. They played their home games at Inman Field in Vermillion, South Dakota.

Schedule

References

South Dakota
South Dakota Coyotes football seasons
South Dakota Coyotes football